Wendell Mosley (1932 – December 31, 1989) was an American football player and coach.
He served as the head football coach at Texas Southern University from 1976 to 1978, compiling a record of 11–20–2.

Head coaching record

References

1932 births
1989 deaths
Oklahoma Sooners football coaches
Texas Southern Tigers football coaches
High school football coaches in Oklahoma
Deaths from cancer in Texas